The 2017 Philippines earthquake may refer to:
 2017 Surigao earthquake -  6.5 earthquake near Surigao City, at least 8 dead
 2017 Batangas earthquakes - Earthquake swarm, largest is  6.0, 6 injured
 2017 Leyte earthquake -  6.5 earthquake in Leyte, 4 killed, 100+ injured

See also
List of earthquakes in 2017
List of earthquakes in the Philippines